Tlou Cleopas Monyepao (born January 17, 1980), professionally known as DJ Cleo, is a South African  Kwaito, House music and Hip hop producer. He was born in Gauteng.
DJ Cleo has enjoyed a long and fruitful career in the South African music industry, he produced successful singles and albums for various artists before going on to produce and release his debut album "Es'khaleni" in 2004. His 2012 Single "Facebook" earned him three awards at 18th SAMA. His eleventh album Eskhaleni 11 (2019), which include single "Yile Gqom" and Yile Piano, Vol. 1 (2019).

Life and career

Early life
Tlou Cleopas Monyepao was born in Vosloorus, Gauteng, South Africa. Monyepao attended Spring Boys High School.

Career
He began his career as a producer of the Unrestricted Breakfast Show hosted by DJ Fresh on YFM. Cleo found himself enjoying producing for radio and soon started exploring producing music for himself and others.

His debut recording was "Will of Steel", which featured on DJ Glen Lewis/DJ Fresh's "Gatecrasher double CD compilation.
He remixed Bucy Rhadebe single  "Uzugcin’ Impilo Yam", originally  released in 2020.

Television 
He was a producer  of e.tv sopie Rhythm City. In 2013, he was the co-host alongside Angie Khumalo of documentary reality show Vaya Mzansi season 1 on SABC 1. Cleo competed on Lip Sync Battle Africa - Season 2. He performed  live on Idols South Africa - Season 17.

Discography

Studio albums
 Es'khaleni (2004)
 Es'khaleni Ext. 2 (2005)
 Es'khaleni Zone 3 
 Es'khaleni Phase 4 (2007)
 Es'khaleni Unit 5 (2008)
 Es'khaleni 6 (2009)
 Es'khaleni 7 (2010)
 Cassanova Vol. 1 (2011)
 Es'khaleni Ext.2 (2013)
 Disclosure (2014)
 Es'khaleni 11 (2019)
 Yile Piano, Vol. 1 (2021)

Awards and nominations

References

External links 
 

1979 births
Living people
People from Vosloorus
South African DJs
South African house musicians
South African record producers
South African musicians
Electronic dance music DJs